Bob Dinners and Larry Noodles Present Tubby Turdner's Celebrity Avalanche is the final album by Thinking Fellers Union Local 282, released in 2001 through Communion Records.

Production
Akin to past albums, the band recorded hours of rehearsals and then cut and pasted together musical passages to create songs.

Critical reception
SF Weekly called the album "the band's most layered recording yet, with no shortage of keyboards, overdubs, vocal harmonies, and perplexing noises." The East Bay Express wrote that "strange and ordinary instruments converge to make a blend of music that is at once identifiable but yet vastly different from anything you've ever heard before." Portland Mercury wrote: "Stooges riffs clash with mechanical clicks; quivering melodies frame John Bonham-style percussion blasts, then melt Velveeta-smooth into cracked-out vocal asides." CMJ New Music Monthly wrote that "an immense, haunting radiance erupts from [the band's] tortured instruments."

Track listing

Personnel 
Thinking Fellers Union Local 282
Mark Davies – instruments
Anne Eickelberg – instruments
Brian Hageman – instruments
Jay Paget – instruments
Hugh Swarts – instruments
Production and additional personnel
Whitney Cowing – photography
Saul Downs – design
Greg Freeman – production, engineering
John Golden – mastering
Earl Kuck – design
Thinking Fellers Union Local 282 – production

References

External links 
 

2001 albums
Thinking Fellers Union Local 282 albums